Oto Iskandar di Nata (Sundanese: , also spelled
Otto Iskandardinata, called Otista and nicknamed Si Jalak Harupat; born 31 March 1897 – disappeared 19 December 1945, retrospectively declared dead 20 December 1945) was an Indonesian politician and National Hero.

Work
In his activities during the period before independence, Oto had served as Deputy Chairperson of the Bandung branch of Budi Utomo between 1921 and 1924, as well as Deputy Chairperson of Budi Utomo in Pekalongan branch in 1924. At that time, he became a member of Pekalongan's Gemeenteraad ("City Council") representing Budi Utomo.

Oto was also active in Sundanese cultural organizations called Paguyuban Pasundan. He became Secretary of the Executive Board in 1928, and became chairman between 1929 and 1942. The organization is engaged in education, socio-cultural, political, economic, youth and women's empowerment.

Oto also became a member of the Volksraad ("People's Council", equivalent to present-day DPR) between 1930 and 1941.

During the Japanese occupation of the Dutch East Indies, he became the head of the Tjahaja newspaper. He was also appointed to the Javanese Central Advisory Council, also set up the occupation government, and later became a member of the Investigating Committee for Preparatory Work for independence (BPUPK) and the  Preparatory Committee for Indonesian Independence (PPKI) formed by the Japanese Sixteenth Army to help prepare for Java's independence.

Disappearance
Based on witness information, Oto is believed to have been murdered on a beach in Mauk District, Tangerang Regency in Banten (formerly West Java). He was abducted by a group called "The Black Troop", who killed him and dumped his body into the sea; the body was never found.

Aftermath and legacy

On 21 December 1952, his funeral was held in absentia. His body was replaced by sand and water taken from the beach, and interred in a cemetery in Lembang, now of West Bandung Regency. He was designated as a National Hero of Indonesia on 6 November 1973, thus legally declaring him dead, as the title is awarded posthumously.

His image appears on the 2004–2016 series of the 20,000 Indonesian rupiah note. His name is now used as street name in various cities in Indonesia on different formats; Otto Iskandardinata, Otto Iskandar Dinata, Otista, and Jalak Harupat. The latter is a Sundanese-mythical strong and courageous cock. It is used as name for Jalak Harupat Stadium, located in his hometown.

See also
List of kidnappings
List of people who disappeared
List of unsolved murders

References 

1897 births
1940s missing person cases
1945 deaths
Indonesian activists
Indonesian collaborators with Imperial Japan
Kidnapped politicians
Male murder victims
Members of the Central Advisory Council
Members of the Volksraad (Dutch East Indies)
Missing person cases in Indonesia
National Heroes of Indonesia
People declared dead in absentia
People from Bandung Regency
Prime Ministers of Indonesia
Sundanese people
Unsolved murders in Indonesia